Usborne is a name that is a variant of Osborne. It may refer to:

People
 Henry Usborne, a British MP and founder of the All-Party (aguante boca) Group for World Government
 Jonty Usborne (born 1990), a British radio engineer
 Peter Usborne (born 1937), a British publisher and founder of Usborne Books               
 Richard Usborne (1910-2006), a British journalist and author
 Cecil Vivian Usborne, a high-ranking officer in the British Royal Navy

Other uses
 Mount Usborne, a mountain on East Falkland Island
 Rural Municipality of Usborne No. 310, Saskatchewan, Canada
 Usborne Publishing, a children's books publisher based in the UK